Fénix is an album by Argentinian jazz composer and saxophonist Gato Barbieri featuring performances recorded in 1971 and first released on the Flying Dutchman label.

Reception

Writing in 1971 for The Village Voice, Robert Christgau referred to Fénix as "the first jazz I've played frequently for pleasure since In a Silent Way" (1969) by Miles Davis. The AllMusic site awarded the album 4½ stars, stating that "at this point in 1971, well before the Muppets would create a caricature out of him, Barbieri was absolutely smoking, and for a certain style of rhythmic free jazz, this is a captivating album indeed".

Track listing
 "Tupac Amaru" (Gato Barbieri) - 4:14
 "Carnavalito" (Edmundo Zaldivar) - 9:08
 "Falsa Bahiana" (Geraldo Pereira) - 	5:50 		
 "El Día Que Me Quieras" (Carlos Gardel, Alfredo Le Pera) - 6:12
 "El Arriero" (Atahualpa Yupanqui) - 7:22
 "Bahia" (Ary Barroso) - 6:22

Personnel
Gato Barbieri - tenor saxophone
Lonnie Liston Smith - piano, electric piano
Joe Beck - electric guitar (track 1)
Ron Carter - electric bass
Lenny White - drums
Gene Golden - congas, bongos
Naná Vasconcelos - berimbau, bongos

References

1971 albums
Albums produced by Bob Thiele
Flying Dutchman Records albums
Gato Barbieri albums